Andrea Joana-Maria Wiktorin (born 1957, Bonn) is a German diplomat who has served in a variety of posts. She became the head of the EU Delegation to Belarus after having served as Ambassador of Germany to Latvia since 2012 and before that, to Armenia between 2007–2009. Since September 2019, she once again serves as the head of the Delegation of the European Union to Armenia, and is based in Yerevan.

See also
 Armenia–European Union relations

References

German women ambassadors
Ambassadors of the European Union to Belarus
Ambassadors of the European Union to Armenia
Ambassadors of Germany to Latvia
Ambassadors of Germany to Armenia
1957 births
Living people